The 2009–10 Liga Indonesia Premier Division (also known as Liga Joss Indonesia for sponsorship reasons) was the 15th season of the Liga Indonesia Premier Division, the second level of the Indonesian football pyramid. The season was held from 25 November 2009 to 29 May 2010.

Teams
From Premier Division

Promoted to Indonesia Super League
Persisam Samarinda
Persema Malang
PSPS Pekanbaru
Persebaya Surabaya

Relegated to First Division
Persibat Batang
PSP Padang
Persekabpas Pasuruan

To Premier Division

Relegated from Indonesia Super League
Deltras F.C.
Persita Tangerang
PSIS Semarang
PSMS Medan

Promoted from First Division
PPSM Magelang
Persires Rengat
Pro Duta F.C.
PS Mojokerto Putra
Persidafon Dafonsoro
Persiram Raja Ampat
Persipro Probolinggo
Persikad Depok (disqualified)
Withdrew or disqualified from competition:
PS Banyuasin
Persibom Bolaang Mongondow
Persikad Depok

Groups
The competition was divided into three groups.

Notes: PS Banyuasin and Persibom Bolaang Mongondow withdrew their participation in this competition; Persikad Depok was disqualified by Football Association of Indonesia.

First round
Matches were played from 25 November 2009 to 1 April 2010.

Ranking of third-placed teams 
Two best-ranked third-placed team will also qualify for the second round.

Second round
Matches were played from 18 May 2010 to 23 May 2010.

Knockout phase

Bracket

Semifinals

Third-place playoff

Final

Awards

Top scorer
 Edward Wilson (Semen Padang) with 20 goals

Best player
 Victor da Silva (Persibo Bojonegoro)

References

Other references
 The official website of Liga Indonesia

Second tier Indonesian football league seasons
Indonesian Premier Division seasons
2009–10 in Indonesian football leagues
Indonesia